Çukurcak may refer to the following villages in Turkey:

 Çukurcak, Balya
 Çukurcak, Sultandağı